Estúdios Globo (Globo Studios, in English), formerly known as Projac, is the main center of television production of the Grupo Globo and Latin Americas largest audio-visual production center. Opened in 1995, it is located in the city of Rio de Janeiro, Brazil. Often is called of CGP-Central Globo de Produção (Globo Production Center). Currently, Projac holds thirteen recording studios, three snack bars, a restaurant, bank. They are often building new studios, centers support to fictional cities, a theater and an administrative building. In 2016, Projac was renamed to Estúdios Globo ( Globo Studios).

History

Before Projac
Rede Globo's former studios, which opened in 1965, were too small for the station's productions. In 1975, the Teatro Fênix (English: Phoenix Theater) was inaugurated, for the production of auditorium programs. Later in 1980, it was discovered that the station's facilities would become improper in a short period of time. Rede Globo's productions studios name is Central Globo de Produção (English: Globo Production Center).

The Jacarepaguá Project
Projac (which was then called the Jacarepaguá Project) was designed to house the studios, administration, production, direction; and leave the Botanical Garden. The greatness of Projac, between conception and inauguration, constitutes an undertaking that took almost fifteen years to be completed. In the long interval between the departure of Globo from its former studios and the definitive entry into Projac, the broadcaster rented other spaces, such as Atlântida Cinematográfica, Cyll Farney's Tycoon studios, part of Renato Aragão's studios, TV Tupi's studios at the old Cassino da Urca, Pólo Rio de Cinema e Vídeo and the Herbert Richers studios, besides producing some programs at the Teatro Fênix.

From Projac to Estúdios Globo
As of February 25, 2016, the name of the complex changed from Projac to Estúdios Globo, as the new board retired the old name due to the name "Projac" being no longer considered a strong and modern title.

The opening of MG4
On August 8, 2019, a new complex called Production Module 4 (MG4) was inaugurated, incorporating three new studios (K, L, M), with an area of 26,000 m². The complex now occupies a total area of 1.73 million m², with thirteen production studios, expanding the production capacity of soap operas, series, miniseries, realities, original formats, humor shows and varieties.

Productions

Split of studios 

Studio A

 Além da Ilusão

Studio B

 Cara e Coragem

Studio C

 Quanto Mais Vida, Melhor!

Studio D

  Travessia 

Studio E

  Caldeirão com Mion 

  The Voice Brasil 

  The Voice Kids 

  The Voice + 

Studio F

  Lady Night  (for the Multishow)

 "Who Wants To Be a Millionaire?" (attraction of Domingão com Huck)

Studio G

  Encontro com Patrícia Poeta 

Studio H

  Todas as Flores 

Studio I

  Zorra 

Studio J

  Sob Pressão 

  Ilha de Ferro 

  Se eu Fechar os Olhos Agora 

Studio K

   Pantanal 

Studio L

Vacant

Studio M

Vacant

Programs and stations recorded elsewhere in the complex

  Vídeo Show 

  É de Casa 

  Big Brother Brasil 

  Rádio Globo

References

Television production companies
Mass media companies of Brazil
TV Globo
1995 establishments in Brazil
Buildings and structures completed in 1995
Television studios